Sir John Cyril Smith  (15 January 1922 – 14 February 2003), born Barnard Castle, County Durham, was an authority on English criminal law and the philosophy of criminal liability. Together with Brian Hogan he was the author of Smith & Hogan's Criminal Law, a leading undergraduate text on English criminal law. The book is now in its sixteenth edition (2021) and has been used as persuasive authority on crimes prosecuted in the law courts of England and Wales and elsewhere in the common law world. In 1998, Lord Bingham praised Smith; "whom most would gladly hail as the outstanding criminal lawyer of our time." Smith and Hogan's Criminal Law is now edited by Professor David Ormerod QC and Karl Laird.

Although Smith won a scholarship to the University of Oxford to read history he never took it up, choosing to work on the railway instead. Smith's initial interest in law was developed whilst he was serving in the Royal Artillery; subsequently, he helped administer courts martial. After leaving the Army in 1947, Smith read law at Downing College at the University of Cambridge. In 1950, Smith was called to the English Bar Lincoln's Inn becoming an Honorary Bencher in 1977.

Smith joined the Department of Law at the University of Nottingham in 1950. He was promoted to Professor of Law in 1957. For thirty years, Smith was influential in making Nottingham University one of the premier law schools in England and Wales. He also spent a year at Harvard University.

During the 1960s Smith was a member of the Criminal Law Revision Committee. The resulting recommendations played an important part in the development of the Theft Acts of 1968 & 1978. Smith was an advocate for a criminal code of England and Wales (an English Criminal Code) working on a draft criminal code in the early 1980s, which was adopted by the Law Commission in 1989. The code has not yet been adopted, which, during his lifetime, was to the great disappointment of Professor Smith.

Smith, who published prolifically as J.C. Smith, had a long association with the Criminal Law Review and wrote many case notes for that journal which were notable for their incisive, playful and amusing analysis.

He also wrote the book Criminal Evidence published by Sweet & Maxwell (1 June 1995).

Smith was a fellow of the British Academy. He was made QC in 1973 and knighted in 1993.

References

Lord Bingham of Cornhill, Lord Chief Justice of England (1998) "Speech at Dinner for HM Judges, The Mansion House, London, 22 July
Professor Andrew Ashworth, Vinerian Professor of English Law (2003) "Obituary, John Smith, The Independent, 21 March

1922 births
2003 deaths
Alumni of Downing College, Cambridge
Academics of the University of Nottingham
British legal scholars
People from Barnard Castle
Royal Artillery officers
Knights Bachelor
Lawyers awarded knighthoods
Commanders of the Order of the British Empire
20th-century King's Counsel
Fellows of the British Academy
British Army personnel of World War II